Grange School Rowing Club is a rowing club on the River Weaver, based at the Boathouse, off Willow Green Lane, Little Leigh, Northwich, Cheshire.

History
The club belongs to The Grange School, Northwich.

In recent years the club has produced multiple British champions.

Honours

British champions

References

Sport in Cheshire
Rowing clubs in England
Northwich
Scholastic rowing in the United Kingdom